Tristram's warbler (Curruca deserticola) is a species of Old World warbler in the family Sylviidae.
It is found in Algeria, Libya, Mauritania, Morocco, Tunisia, and Western Sahara.
Its natural habitat is subtropical dry shrubland.

The species is named after Reverend Henry Baker Tristram, who also collected natural history specimens.

References 

Tristram's warbler
Birds of North Africa
Taxa named by Henry Baker Tristram
Tristram's warbler
Taxonomy articles created by Polbot